Neuro-symbolic AI integrates neural and symbolic AI architectures to address complementary strengths and weaknesses of each, providing a robust AI capable of reasoning, learning, and cognitive modeling. As argued by Valiant and many others, the effective construction of rich computational cognitive models demands the combination of sound symbolic reasoning and efficient machine learning models. Gary Marcus, argues that: "We cannot construct rich cognitive models in an adequate, automated way without the triumvirate of hybrid architecture, rich prior knowledge, and sophisticated techniques for reasoning." Further, "To build a robust, knowledge-driven approach to AI we must have the machinery of symbol-manipulation in our toolkit. Too much of useful knowledge is abstract to make do without tools that represent and manipulate abstraction, and to date, the only machinery that we know of that can manipulate such abstract knowledge reliably is the apparatus of symbol-manipulation."

Henry Kautz, Francesca Rossi, and Bart Selman have also argued for a synthesis. Their arguments are based on a need to address the two kinds of thinking discussed in Daniel Kahneman's book, Thinking Fast and Slow. Kahneman describes human thinking as having two components, System 1 and System 2. System 1 is fast, automatic, intuitive and unconscious. System 2 is slower, step-by-step, and explicit. System 1 is used for pattern recognition. System 2 handles planning, deduction, and deliberative thinking. In this view, deep learning best handles the first kind of cognition while symbolic reasoning best handles the second kind. Both are needed for a robust, reliable AI that can learn, reason, and interact with humans to accept advice and answer questions. In fact, such dual-process models with explicit references to the two contrasting systems have been worked on since the 1990s, both in AI and in Cognitive Science, by a number of researchers (e.g.,).

Types of approaches

Approaches for integration are varied. Henry Kautz's taxonomy of neuro-symbolic architectures, along with some examples, follows:
 Symbolic Neural symbolic—is the current approach of many neural models in natural language processing, where words or subword tokens are both the ultimate input and output of large language models. Examples include BERT, RoBERTa, and GPT-3. 
 Symbolic[Neural]—is exemplified by AlphaGo, where symbolic techniques are used to call neural techniques. In this case the symbolic approach is Monte Carlo tree search and the neural techniques learn how to evaluate game positions.
 Neural|Symbolic—uses a neural architecture to interpret perceptual data as symbols and relationships that are then reasoned about symbolically. The Neural-Concept Learner is an example.
 Neural:Symbolic → Neural—relies on symbolic reasoning to generate or label training data that is subsequently learned by a deep learning model, e.g., to train a neural model for symbolic computation by using a Macsyma-like symbolic mathematics system to create or label examples.
 Neural_{Symbolic}—uses a neural net that is generated from symbolic rules. An example is the Neural Theorem Prover, which constructs a neural network from an AND-OR proof tree generated from knowledge base rules and terms. Logic Tensor Networks also fall into this category.
 Neural[Symbolic]—allows a neural model to directly call a symbolic reasoning engine, e.g., to perform an action or evaluate a state.
These categories are not exhaustive, for example, as they do not consider multi-agent systems. In 2005, Bader and Hitzler presented a more fine-grained categorization that considered, e.g., whether the use of symbols included logic or not, and if it did, whether the logic was propositional or first-order logic. The 2005 categorization and Kautz' taxonomy above are compared and contrasted in a 2021 article. Recently, Sepp Hochreiter argued that Graph Neural Networks "...are the predominant models of neural-symbolic computing" since "[t]hey describe the properties of molecules, simulate social networks, or predict future states in physical and engineering applications with particle-particle interactions."

As a prerequisite for artificial general intelligence

Marcus argues that "...hybrid architectures that combine learning and symbol manipulation are necessary for robust intelligence, but not sufficient", and that there are:

"...four cognitive prerequisites for building robust artificial intelligence: 
 hybrid architectures that combine large-scale learning with the representational and computational powers of symbol-manipulation, 
 large-scale knowledge bases—likely leveraging innate frameworks—that incorporate symbolic knowledge along with other forms of knowledge, 
 reasoning mechanisms capable of leveraging those knowledge bases in tractable ways, and 
 rich cognitive models that work together with those mechanisms and knowledge bases."
This echoes the much earlier calls for hybrid models in as early as the 1990s.

History

Garcez and Lamb described research in this area as being ongoing for at least the past twenty years (actually more than thirty years by now). A series of workshops on neuro-symbolic AI has been held every year since 2005 . In the early 1990s, an initial set of workshops on this topic were organized.

Open research questions

Many key research questions remain, such as:
 What is the best way to integrate neural and symbolic architectures?
 How should symbolic structures be represented within neural networks and extracted from them?
 How should common-sense knowledge be learned and reasoned about?
 How can abstract knowledge that is hard to encode logically be handled?

Implementations

Some specific implementations of neuro-symbolic approaches are:
 Logic Tensor Networks—these encode logical formulas as neural networks and simultaneously learn term neural encodings, term weights, and formula weights from data.
 DeepProbLog—which combines neural networks with the probabilistic reasoning of ProbLog.

Citations

References 
 
 
 
 
 
 Hochreiter, Sepp. "Toward a Broad AI." Commun. ACM 65(4): 56-57 (2022). https://dl.acm.org/doi/pdf/10.1145/3512715
 
 
 
 
 
 
 
 
 
 
 
 Sun, Ron; Alexandre, Frederic (1997). Connectionist Symbolic Integration. Lawrence Erlbaum Associates.

See also 
 Symbolic AI
 Connectionist AI
 Hybrid intelligent systems

External links 

 Artificial Intelligence: Workshop series on Neural-Symbolic Learning and Reasoning

Artificial intelligence